The American Jockey Club Cup (Japanese アメリカジョッキークラブカップ) is a Grade 2 horse race in for Thoroughbred colts and fillies aged four and over run over a distance of 2,200 metres at Nakayama Racecourse. This races is for friendship between Japan Racing Association and New York Jockey Club.

The race is run in late January and serves as a trial race for the spring edition of the Tenno Sho.

It was first run in 1960 over 2000 metres before the distance was increased to 2600 metres in the following year. The distance was reduced to 2200 metres in 1962 before the returning to 2600 metres a year later. The distance of the race was reduced to 2500 metres in 1967 and then to 2400 metres in 1972 before returning to 2500 metres in 1980. The race was run over its current distance for the first time in 1984.

Among the winners of the race have been Special Week, Matsurida Gogh, Tosen Jordan, Blast Onepiece and Rulership.

Records
Most successful horse (2 wins):
 Speed Symboli – 1967, 1970
 Amber Shadai – 1982, 1983
 Never Bouchon – 2009, 2010

Winners since 1988

Earlier winners

 1960 - Onward Bell
 1961 - Yashima First
 1962 - Takamagahara
 1963 - Korehisa
 1964 - Suzu Top Run
 1965 - Asahoko
 1966 - Haku Zuiko
 1967 - Speed Symboli
 1968 - New Onward
 1969 - Asaka O
 1970 - Speed Symboli
 1971 - Akane Tenryu
 1972 - Mejiro Asama
 1973 - Onward Guy
 1974 - Take Hope
 1975 - Strong Eight
 1976 - White Fontaine
 1977 - Green Grass
 1978 - Kashu Chikara
 1979 - Sakura Shori
 1980 - Kane Mikasa
 1981 - Hoyo Boy
 1982 - Amber Shadai
 1983 - Amber Shadai
 1984 - Shuzan King
 1985 - Sakura Gaisen
 1986 - Suda Hawk
 1987 - Miho Shinzan

See also
 Horse racing in Japan
 List of Japanese flat horse races

References

Turf races in Japan